Mali Rakitovec is a small village in the Municipality of Kamnik in the Upper Carniola region of Slovenia.

References

External links

Mali Rakitovec at Geopedia

Populated places in the Municipality of Kamnik